Heinrich XXIV, Prince Reuss of Greiz (20 March 187813 October 1927) was the last reigning Prince Reuss of Greiz from 1902 to 1918. Then he became head of the House Reuss of Greiz, which became extinct at his death in 1927.

Early life
Heinrich XXIV was born at Greiz, Principality of Reuss-Greiz, only son of Heinrich XXII, Prince Reuss of Greiz (1846–1902), (son of Heinrich XX, Prince Reuss of Greiz, and Princess Caroline of Hesse-Homburg) and his wife, Princess Ida of Schaumburg-Lippe (1852–1891), (daughter of Adolf I, Prince of Schaumburg-Lippe and Princess Hermine of Waldeck-Pyrmont).

Prince Reuss of Greiz
On the death of his father on 19 April 1902, Heinrich XXIV succeeded him as Prince Reuss of Greiz.

Because of Heinrich XXIV's physical and mental disabilities, the result of a childhood accident, Heinrich XIV, Prince Reuss Younger Line served as regent of Reuss Elder Line from 1902 until his death in 1913; the regency continued thereafter under Heinrich XIV's successor, Heinrich XXVII, until the abolition of the German monarchies in 1918.

On Heinrich XXIV's death in 1927, the House Reuss of Greiz became extinct, the prince having died unmarried with no issue; the titles passed to Heinrich XXVII of Reuss Younger Line.

Ancestry

Notes and sources
The Royal House of Stuart, London, 1969, 1971, 1976, Addington, A. C., Reference: II 331
Gehrlein Thomas, The House of Reuss - Older and Younger line Börde Verlag 2006, 

1878 births
1927 deaths
People from Greiz
People from the Principality of Reuss-Greiz
Princes of Reuss